Scott Atran (born February 6, 1952) is an American-French cultural anthropologist who is Emeritus Director of Research in Anthropology at the Centre national de la recherche scientifique in Paris, Research Professor at the University of Michigan, and cofounder of ARTIS International and of the Centre for the Resolution of Intractable Conflict at Oxford University. He has studied and written about terrorism, violence, religion, indigenous environmental management and the cross-cultural foundations of biological classification; and he has done fieldwork with terrorists and Islamic fundamentalists, as well as political leaders and Native American peoples.

Early life and education
Atran was born in New York City in 1952. While a student, he became assistant to anthropologist Margaret Mead at the American Museum of Natural History. He received his BA from Columbia College, MA from Johns Hopkins University, and PhD in anthropology from Columbia University.

Career
Atran has taught at Cambridge University, Hebrew University in Jerusalem, the École pratique des hautes études and École polytechnique in Paris, and John Jay College of Criminal Justice in New York City. He is emeritus research director in anthropology at the French National Centre for Scientific Research and member of the Jean Nicod Institute at the École normale supérieure. He is also research professor of public policy and psychology at the University of Michigan, founding fellow of the Centre for the Resolution of Intractable Conflict at Oxford University, and cofounder of ARTIS International. He was elected to the National Academy of Sciences.

Early years
In 1974 he originated a debate at the Royaumont Abbey in France on the nature of universals in human thought and society. Other participants included linguist Noam Chomsky, psychologist Jean Piaget, anthropologists Gregory Bateson and Claude Lévi-Strauss, and biologists François Jacob and Jacques Monod. Howard Gardner and others consider this event a milestone in the development of cognitive science.

Research
Atran has experimented on the ways scientists and ordinary people categorize and reason about nature, on the cognitive and evolutionary psychology of religion, and on the limits of rationality in understanding and managing deep-seated cultural and political conflict. His work has been widely published internationally in the popular press, and in scientific journals in a variety of disciplines. He has briefed members of the US Congress and the National Security Council staff with documents and presentations including "The Devoted Actor versus the Rational Actor in World Conflict", "Comparative Anatomy and Evolution of Global Network Terrorism" and "Pathways to and from Violent Extremism". He was an early critic of U.S. intervention in Iraq and of deepening involvement in Afghanistan. In April 2015, he addressed the United Nations Security Council on "Youth, Peace, and Security."

Atran has also been a staunch opponent of political attempts to eliminate government funding for social science, arguing that it is critical to the national interest, including innovation and security in business, technology, medicine and defense.

On conflict negotiation
Atran has published research on the limits of rational choice in political and cultural conflict.

He has collaborated on research on how political negotiations could be made more likely to produce agreement. Atran and the psychologists Jeremy Ginges and Douglas Medin and political scientist Khalil Shikaki conducted an experiment that surveyed "600 Jewish settlers in the West Bank, more than 500 Palestinian refugees, and more than 700 Palestinian students, half of whom identified with Hamas and Palestinian Islamic Jihad." The researchers divided the subjects into three groups, each presented with a different "hypothetical peace deal." In the basic situation, those surveyed were presented with "a two-state solution in which the Israelis would withdraw from 99 percent of the West Bank and Gaza but would not have to absorb Palestinian refugees"; the proposal "did not go over well." For the second group, the hypothetical deal "was sweetened with cash compensation from the United States and the European Union, such as a billion dollars a year for a hundred years, or a guarantee that the people would live in peace and prosperity. With these sweeteners on the table, the nonabsolutists, as expected, softened their opposition a bit. But the absolutists, forced to contemplate a taboo tradeoff, were even more disgusted, angry, and prepared to resort to violence." But for the third group, the proposed two-state solution was "augmented with a purely symbolic declaration by the enemy in which it compromised on one of its sacred values."

In the deal presented to Israeli settlers, the Palestinians "would give up any claims to their right of return" or "would be required to recognize the historic and legitimate right of the Jewish people to Eretz Israel"; in that presented to the Palestinians, Israel "would recognize the historic and legitimate right of the Palestinians to their own state and would apologize for all wrongs done to the Palestinian people," or would "give up what they believe is their sacred right to the West Bank" or would "symbolically recognize the historic legitimacy of the right of return [without in fact granting it]". In summarizing the result, cognitive psychologist Steven Pinker claims, "Unlike the bribes of money or peace, the symbolic concession of a sacred value by the enemy, especially when it acknowledges a sacred value on one's own side, reduced the absolutists' anger, disgust, and willingness to endorse violence."

In a study of Middle East leaders published in Science (journal), Atran interviewed leaders, as distinct from popular views. In the earlier responses, people rejected material concessions without symbolic concessions, but were open to negotiations that started with symbolic concessions. Leaders responded the same way, except that they saw the symbolic concession as only an introduction to significant material concessions as well.

For example, when the researchers asked Musa Abu Marzouk, deputy chairman of Hamas, about a trade-off for peace without granting a right of return, he said “No.” When he was offered a trade-off with a substantial material incentive, he said “No” even more emphatically; “we do not sell ourselves for any amount.” But when he was offered an apology, he said “Yes,” although an apology would only be a beginning. “Our houses and land were taken away from us and something has to be done about that.”

Similarly, when the researchers asked Binyamin Netanyahu (then opposition leader), “Would you seriously consider accepting a two-state solution following the 1967 borders if all major Palestinian factions, including Hamas, were to recognize the right of the Jewish people to an independent state in the region?” he said, “Yes, but the Palestinians would have to show that they sincerely mean it, change their textbooks and anti-Semitic characterizations and then allow some border adjustments so that Ben Gurion [Airport] would be out of range of shoulder-fired missiles.”

Atran has worked with the United Nations Security Council and has been engaged in conflict negotiations in the Middle East

Field research on terrorism
His work on the ideology and social evolution of transnational terrorism, which has included fieldwork with mujahedin and supporters in Europe, the Middle East, Central and Southeast Asia, and North Africa, has challenged common assumptions. Cognitive psychologist Steven Pinker summarizes some of Atran's findings thus: 

Atran has summarized his work and conclusions: 

Regarding Atran's analysis of the Islamic State of Iraq and the Levant as a revolutionary movement of "world-historic proportions," a writer for The New York Times considers Atran: 

The Chronicle of Higher Education accompanied Atran to frontlines in the battle against ISIS in Iraq, where he and his research team were assessing "will to fight" among the combatants: 

A series of experimental studies directed by Atran and social psychologist Ángel Gómez performed with captured ISIS fighters, fighters of the Kurdistan Workers Party (PKK), Peshmerga, Iraq Army and Arab Sunni Militia in Iraq, as well as with thousands of ordinary European citizens, have further elaborated the Devoted Actor framework in an effort to “help to inform policy decisions for the common defense.” According to reporting from CNN:

Atran argues in an interview in The Washington Post that: "Never in history have so few people with so few means caused so much fear." He and his research colleagues at ARTIS International contend that: 

Atran and colleagues propose an alternative approach, driven by theoretically-framed field research that ground-truths big data and informs policy-making while maintaining intellectual independence. In 2017, Atran co-authored a groundbreaking paper with Angel Gomez, Lucia Lopez-Rodriguez, Hammad Sheikh, Jeremy Ginges, Lydia Wilson, Hoshang Waziri, Alexandra Vazquez, and Richard Davis. Titled 'The Devoted Actor's Will to Fight and the Spiritual Dimension of Human Conflict', the piece focuses on the spiritual dimensions of conflict based upon field work in Iraq with combatants and lab studies, assessing non-utilitarian dimensions of conflict. Atran and his team have validated aspects of these behavioral findings in neuroimaging studies of radicalized individuals in Europe, including greater willingness to fight and die for sacred versus non-sacred values that involves inhibition of deliberative reasoning in favor of rapid, duty-bound responses.

Other work
Atran conducts ongoing research in Guatemala, Mexico, and the U.S. on universal and culture-specific aspects of biological categorization and environmental reasoning and decision making among Maya and other Native Americans. His research team has focused on immigration of Spanish-speaking Ladinos and highland Q'eqchi' people of Guatemala into the northern lowland Petén region, and their interaction with the lowland Itza whose language is near extinction but whose agro-forestry practices, including use of dietary and medicinal plants, may still tell us much about pre-colonial management of the Maya lowlands. Atran found that the Itza' rejected majority-culture offers for exploiting natural resources as violating spiritual injunctions that may represent the summary wisdom of centuries of experience; however, later follow-up studies suggest that this wisdom, and the sustainable practices it encouraged, are vanishing as the last Itza speakers die out.

Atran's debates with Sam Harris, Dan Dennett, Richard Dawkins and others during the 2006 Beyond Belief symposium on the limits of reason and the role of religion in modern society highlight the differences between these authors, who see religion as fundamentally false beliefs associated with primitive cosmology, as well as politically and socially repressive, and Atran who sees unfalsifiable but semantically absurd religious beliefs and binding ritual obligations as historically critical to the formation and social cohesion of large-scale societies and current motivators for both conflict and cooperation.

Bibliography

As sole author
 Cognitive Foundations of Natural History: Towards an Anthropology of Science, Cambridge University Press, 1993; 
 In Gods We Trust: The Evolutionary Landscape of Religion, Oxford University Press, 2002;  
 Talking to the Enemy: Sacred Values, Violent Extremism, and What it Means to be Human, Penguin, 2011; 
 L'Etat islamique est une révolution, Les Liens qui Libèrent Editions, 2016;

As editor or co-author
 Histoire du concept d'espece dans les sciences de la vie, ed. (1987)
 Folkbiology, ed. with Douglas Medin, MIT Press (1999)
 Plants of the Peten Itza' Maya, with Ximena Lois and Edilberto Ucan Ek, University of Michigan Museums Press (2004)
 The Native Mind and the Cultural Construction of Nature, with Douglas Medin, MIT Press (2008)
 "Values, Empathy, and Fairness Across Social Barriers". ed., Annals of the New York Academy of Sciences, with Oscar Vilarroya, Arcadi Navarro, Kevin Ochsner and Adolf Tobeña (2009)

References

External links

 Atran's ARTIS Research site
 Atran's blog site at Oxford University 
 Atran's Huffington Post Contribution Page

Living people
1952 births
American anthropologists
French anthropologists
Psychological anthropologists
American political scientists
American atheists
Anthropology educators
Psychology educators
Columbia College (New York) alumni
Academics of the University of Cambridge
Academics of the University of Oxford
Academic staff of the École Normale Supérieure
University of Michigan faculty
Gerald R. Ford School of Public Policy faculty
Faculty
John Jay College of Criminal Justice faculty
Cognitive science of religion
Fellows of the Cognitive Science Society
Columbia Graduate School of Arts and Sciences alumni